Coleophora celsa is a moth of the family Coleophoridae.

References

celsa
Moths described in 1994